Berezniki is a rural locality (a village) in Lobanovskoye Rural Settlement, Permsky District, Perm Krai, Russia. The population was 23 as of 2010. There are 3 streets.

Geography 
Berezniki is located 32 km southeast of Perm (the district's administrative centre) by road. Mulyanka is the nearest rural locality.

References 

Rural localities in Permsky District